Alexander Francis "Seldom" Beaton (born April 28, 1953 in Antigonish, Nova Scotia) is a retired professional ice hockey player who played 25 games in the National Hockey League and 153 games in the World Hockey Association.  He played for the Cincinnati Stingers, New York Rangers, Edmonton Oilers, and Birmingham Bulls.

Notoriously, Beaton was traded in 1982 by the New York Islanders to the Minnesota North Stars, in exchange for a steak dinner.

Career statistics

References

1953 births
Living people
Birmingham Bulls players
Birmingham Bulls (CHL) players
Canadian ice hockey left wingers
Cincinnati Stingers players
Edmonton Oilers (WHA) players
Hampton Gulls (AHL) players
Hampton Gulls (SHL) players
Ice hockey people from Nova Scotia
New York Rangers players
People from Antigonish, Nova Scotia
Undrafted National Hockey League players